Sir John Basil Zochonis  (2 October 1929 – 30 November 2013) was a British industrialist and philanthropist, the chairman of PZ Cussons, and the great nephew of its founder, George Zochonis.

Early life
John Zochonis was educated at Corpus Christi College, Oxford.

Career
He joined PZ Cussons in 1953.

Philanthropy
He was well known for his charity, and has been called "possibly the largest giver in the North West". He gave to, inter alia, Chethams School of Music, the Clonter Opera, the Buxton Festival, the Manchester International Festival, Manchester Art Gallery, the Lowry Centre, Manchester Midday Concerts Society, Royal Exchange Theatre and the Northern Chamber Orchestra.

Personal life
In 1990, he married Brigid Demetriades (née Smyth), who survives him.

References

1929 births
2013 deaths
Knights Bachelor
Alumni of Corpus Christi College, Oxford
Deputy Lieutenants of Greater Manchester
John
20th-century British philanthropists